"Hangover" is the third official single by Starboy Nathan, from his second album 3D - Determination, Dedication, Desire. The single was released on 16 September 2011 on digital download. The song charted at number 92 in the UK Singles Chart and number 29 on the UK R&B Chart. The song features vocals from English rapper and former Grime MC Wretch 32.

Music video
A music video to accompany the release of "Hangover" was first released onto YouTube on 27 June 2011, at a total length of four minutes and twenty-nine seconds.

Track listings
Digital download
 "Hangover" (Radio Edit) [feat. Wretch 32] - 3:23
 "Caught Me Slippin'" (Flo Rida Mix) - 3:30

Digital EP
 "Hangover" (Radio Edit) [feat. Wretch 32] - 3:23
 "Hangover" (Agent X L.A.X. Remix Radio Edit) [feat. Wretch 32] - 3:13
 "Hangover" (Agent X L.A.X. Remix Extended) [feat. Wretch 32] - 5:18
 "Hangover" (Sticky Remix) [feat. Wretch 32] - 4:48
 "Hangover" (Claybeat Morning After Remix) [feat. Wretch 32] - 4:03
 "Caught Me Slippin'" (Flo Rida Mix) - 3:30

Chart performance

Release history

References

2011 singles
2011 songs
Songs written by Ali Tennant